Hite-Finney House was a historic building at 183 North Jefferson Street in Martinsville, Morgan County, Indiana. It was built in 1855, and was a two-story, transitional Greek Revival / Italianate style brick I-house. The building partially collapsed in 2003.  It was destroyed by fire in August 2006, and was fully demolished in October 2009.

It was listed on the National Register of Historic Places on January 11, 1996. It was removed in 2012 after its destruction.

See also
National Register of Historic Places listings in Morgan County, Indiana

References

Former National Register of Historic Places in Indiana
Houses on the National Register of Historic Places in Indiana
Greek Revival houses in Indiana
Italianate architecture in Indiana
Houses completed in 1855
Houses in Morgan County, Indiana
National Register of Historic Places in Morgan County, Indiana